Waterloo High School is a public high school in Atwater, Ohio, United States.  It is the only high school in the Waterloo Local School District. Athletic teams compete as the Waterloo Vikings in the Ohio High School Athletic Association as a member of the Mahoning Valley Athletic Conference.

History
The school founded in 1967 from the merger of the former Atwater and Randolph High Schools. The Waterloo school district was created two years earlier through the merger of the Atwater and Randolph districts on October 15, 1965. The name Waterloo was chosen on October 18, 1965. The Viking mascot as well as the school colors of burgundy and white were voted on by the student bodies of both schools in October 1966 from 6 entries, 3 coming from each school. The new High School on Industry Road opened in Sept. 1968 & was finished & dedicated on Sunday Jan. 26,1969.

References

External links

Waterloo Local School District website

High schools in Portage County, Ohio
Public high schools in Ohio